Philotheca difformis is a species of flowering plant in the family Rutaceae and is endemic to continental eastern Australia. It is a shrub with variably-shaped leaves depending on subspecies, and white flowers arranged singly or in groups of up to four on the ends of the branchlets. Subspecies difformis is commonly known as the small-leaf wax-flower.

Description
The leaves are fleshy, glabrous, glandular warty on  a short petiole but vary in size and shaped depending on subspecies. The ten stamens are woolly-hairy.

Taxonomy and naming
This species was first formally described in 1837 by Stephan Endlicher from an unpublished description by Allan Cunningham who gave it the name Eriostemon difformis. Endlicher published the description in Enumaratio plantarum. Cunningham collected the type specimens in "sterile country on the Lachlan River" on 24 May 1817, during John Oxley's first expedition.

In 1998, Wilson changed the name to Philotheca difformis in the journal Nuytsia and described two subspecies:
Philotheca difformis  (A.Cunn. ex Endl.) Paul G. Wilson subsp. difformis;
Philotheca difformis subsp. smithiana (Benth.) Paul G. Wilson.

Distribution and habitat
Philotheca difformis subspecies difformis grows in rocky areas in woodland, mainly in inland parts of south-east Queensland, inland New South Wales, north-west Victoria and the Flinders Ranges in South Australia.

Subspecies smithiana often grows on rock outcrops and is found near the coast in south-east Queensland and in north-eastern New South Wales as far south as Singleton.

References

difformis
Flora of New South Wales
Flora of Queensland
Flora of Victoria (Australia)
Flora of South Australia
Sapindales of Australia
Plants described in 1837
Taxa named by Allan Cunningham (botanist)